Doğanpınar can refer to the following villages in Turkey:

 Doğanpınar, Araç
 Doğanpınar, Bandırma